Ibrahim Al-Taher (born 1959) is a Qatari long-distance runner. He competed in the marathon at the 1984 Summer Olympics.

References

1959 births
Living people
Athletes (track and field) at the 1984 Summer Olympics
Qatari male long-distance runners
Qatari male marathon runners
Olympic athletes of Qatar
Place of birth missing (living people)